KNWQ (1140 AM) is radio station licensed to Palm Springs, California. It airs a news-talk format and is part of a simulcast with 970 KNWZ and 1250 KNWH. It is owned by Alpha Media.

1140 AM is a United States and Mexican clear-channel frequency, on which XEMR-AM and WRVA share Class A status.

History
The station began broadcasting February 12, 1946 and held the call sign KCMJ. It was owned by Palm Springs Broadcasting Company and originally broadcast at 1340 kHz, running 250 watts. In 1958, the station's frequency was changed to 1010 kHz, running 1,000 watts during the day and 500 watts at night. In 1985, its frequency was changed to 1140 kHz, running 10,000 watts during the day and 2,500 watts at night.

KCMJ aired a country music format in the 1980s and early 1990s. In 1994, the station adopted a sports talk format. In 1995, it adopted an adult standards format. In 2001, the station adopted a news-talk format, and the adult standards format moved to AM 1010, along with the KCMJ call sign. Its call sign was briefly changed to KNWZ on January 18, 2001, before being changed to KNWQ on January 25, 2001.

References

External links

News and talk radio stations in the United States
NWZ
Mass media in Riverside County, California
Palm Springs, California
Radio stations established in 1946
1946 establishments in California
Alpha Media radio stations